The Romanian Wikipedia (abr. ro.wiki or ro.wp) is the Romanian language edition of Wikipedia, the free encyclopedia. Started on 12 July 2003, as of  this edition has  articles and is the  largest Wikipedia edition. In December 2004, users on the Romanian Wikipedia started to talk about founding a local chapter of Wikimedia, Asociația Wikimedia România.

History

The first articles in the Romanian Wikipedia were written in July 2003, with the first version of the main page being drafted on 12 July. The user interface, initially in English, started being translated into Romanian by Bogdan Stăncescu (registered with the username Gutza) as soon as he was given sysop rights. The same user subsequently contacted several Romanian universities that were available on the internet, as well as the Romanian Academy, in order to attract new contributors. His efforts were soon remarked by the Romanian media, who invited him on several occasions to introduce the project to the public. By the end of 2003, the Romanian Wikipedia had exceeded 3,000 articles, ranking 16th among all Wikipedias. The 10,000th article was written on 13 December 2004, and the 50,000th on 5 January 2007.

In April 2004, the Romanian Wikipedia supported the launch of the Aromanian Wikipedia (see Aromanian language).

In June 2004, the Romanian Wikipedia encountered problems concerning its division and the creation of a separate Moldovan Wikipedia (see Moldovan language). A Moldovan-language version of Wikipedia was brought into existence because it was created automatically together with a larger number of other Wikipedias, as the language had been assigned separate ISO 639 codes (mo/mol—which were deprecated in November 2008 by the ISO authorities). At its beginnings, it worked as a portal redirecting to the Romanian Wikipedia, but in March 2005, it eventually began allowing content (although only intended for Cyrillic Moldovan/Romanian as it was used before 1989 in the Moldavian SSR and remains in use only in the breakaway state of Transnistria), starting big editing wars and endless discussion. Between December 2006 up to its deletion in November 2017, it was frozen and editing was no longer permitted. This question was raised from time to time, although users on Wikipedia voted on its closure and its deletion.

The Romanian Wikipedia reached the 100,000 article milestone on 11 January 2008. As of March 2023, it has 437,000 articles and 1,050 active users, of whom 17 are administrators.

Peculiarities

The logo of the Romanian Wikipedia was at first slightly different from the logos of other Wikipedias. The Cyrillic letter И in the logo was replaced with the Romanian letter Ă. It was later restored to the generic Wikipedia logo. 

Articles can contain small spelling variations, mostly regarding the use of the letters â and î, both used for the close central unrounded vowel  (cf. Romanian alphabet). According to the 1993 spelling rules promoted by the Romanian Academy,  is transcribed as either î, when used as the first or last letter of words, or â, when it occurs in the middle of the word (with some exceptions). Still, between 1953 and 1993, the Romanian language only used î - after 1964 an exception was made for derivations of the words România ("Romania"), român ("Romanian") and related words. The Academy rules are mandatory in government organisations and in state schools in Romania. Moldova adopted the Latin alphabet for the Romanian language before the spelling reform in 1993, and it didn't switch to the new spelling up until 2001, using the letter î before exclusively (exceptions were made for România and the other related words, spelled with â). In practice, either usage is acceptable in both countries, and indeed there are publishing houses and printed magazines that use either or both of the two rules. Vojvodina uses the new Romanian spelling. Other spelling differences include sunt/sînt or niciun/nici un. The Romanian Wikipedia community adopted a language policy stating that both pre-1993 and post-1993 spelling norms are permitted, and editing an article just to switch it from one norm to the other is not acceptable; switching is allowed if the article is significantly expanded or rewritten.

Concerning the addressing policy, Romanian Wikipedia uses the polite forms of the personal pronouns and verbs. A policy on this was discussed in early 2006, and consensus was reached for the use of dumneavoastră (polite "you") instead of tu (familiar "you") on its pages.

Timeline 

Annual number of articles as of December (each year) since the creation of edition.

Number of total articles at a specific time
 October 2003: 250 articles
 7 April 2004: 5,000 articles
 12 December 2004: 10,000 articles
 5 January 2007: 50,000 articles
 11 January 2008: 100,000 articles
 21 May 2009: 125,000 articles
 13 September 2010: 150,000 articles
 5 August 2012: 200,000 articles
 25 July 2014: 250,000 articles
 13 April 2015: 300,000 articles
 2 September 2015: 350,000 articles
 15 August 2019: 400,000 articles

References

External links

  Romanian Wikipedia
  Romanian Wikipedia mobile version
  Aromanian Wikipedia
  Aromanian Wikipedia mobile version

Wikipedias by language
Internet properties established in 2003
Wikipedia
Romanian encyclopedias
Wikipedias in Romance languages